Fashion Takes a Holiday is the fourth and final studio album by the Australian rock band Tlot Tlot and their only covers album. It was released in 1994.

Track list 

The band covered "Just Can't Get Enough" on their live album The Live Set - Volume 1 two years earlier - the recording from that album is included on this album.

As well as the tracks listed here, at least two more tracks, "The Girlfriend Song" and "Stink", were recorded in the sessions. "The Girlfriend Song" was released as a stand-alone single in 1995 with "In the Summertime" and "Stink" as B-sides.

External links 
 Fashion Takes a Holiday on Discogs

1994 albums
Tlot Tlot albums